Ivan Šibl (28 October 1917 – 30 March 1989) was a Yugoslav Partisans officer and Yugoslav People's Army Lieutenant Colonel General, as well as a writer and politician. Šibl was born in Virovitica. During the World War II, he joined the anti-fascist movement led by the Communist Party of Yugoslavia (KPJ). He was a member of a clandestine resistance group in Zagreb before becoming KPJ's commissar of the Banija Partisan Detachment and then the commissar of the Kalnik Partisan Detachment in 1942. The following year, Šibl became the commissar of the 2nd Operational Zone, and in 1944–1945 the KPJ's commissar of the 10th Corps of the Yugoslav Army. After the war, Šibl became the editor-in-chief of the official gazette of the KPJ, the Borba in 1953–1954. He moved to the position of the general director of the Radio Television Zagreb in 1954–1963. In 1954, Šibl was appointed member of the Central Committee of the Communist Party of Croatia (nominally independent political organisation, and de facto a branch of the KPJ), a member of the Croatian Sabor and the Yugoslav Parliament in several terms. He was the head of the Croatian Association of Veterans of the National Liberation War in 1969–1971. During the Croatian Spring, Šibl supported the reformist leadership of the Socialist Republic of Croatia led by Savka Dabčević-Kučar and Miko Tripalo. Following the defeat of Dabčević-Kučar and Tripalo and suppression of Croatian Spring in late 1971, Šibl was removed from all party and state functions.

Since 1950s, Šibl wrote several works containing autobiographical elements. His works were subsequently used as the basis for film screenplays of We're Going Separate Ways, When You Hear the Bells, The Pine Tree in the Mountain, and as the literary basis for television drama series Sumorna jesen. Šibl's principal literary works are Zagrebačka oblast u narodnooslobodilačkoj borbi ("Zagreb District in the People's Liberation Struggle"), Iz ilegalnog Zagreba 1941 ("From Clandestine Zagreb 1941"), Partizanski razgovori ("Partisan Talks"), Ratni dnevnik ("Wartime Diary"), and Sjećanja ("Memories").

Lifetime achievement award by the Croatia's public television and radio broadcasting company Hrvatska radiotelevizija is named after Šibl.

References

1917 births
1989 deaths
People from Virovitica
20th-century Croatian writers
Yugoslav generals
Yugoslav communists
Yugoslav Partisans members
Recipients of the Order of the People's Hero